The Mannin Moar was a non-championship Grand Prix held in Douglas, Isle of Man, Great Britain in 1933, 1934 and 1935. The most successful driver was Brian Lewis, having won all three races.

Background

Rules and restrictions
When the R.A.C. wanted to organise a race on a street circuit, because of the popular Monaco Grand Prix, they found that it was illegal to close public roads for racing in the British mainland. However, the Isle of Man had its own laws, so a racing circuit was designed on the streets of Douglas. Two races were organised, Mannin Beg (English: Small Man) for non-supercharged voiturettes with engines smaller than 1500cc on 12 July 1933  and Mannin Moar (English: Great Man) for cars with engines over 1500cc and supercharged voiturettes on 14 July 1933.

Riding mechanics were mandatory for all cars. This was possibly the last time this rule was used in Grand Prix motor racing. The purpose of this rule was that the mechanics could signal to the flag marshals that their drivers wanted to pass a car in front, so that the marshals could flag that car to get out of the way. On behalf of the drivers, Earl Howe wrote a letter to The Motor complaining that the rules were considered an embarrassment and would turn races from international events into second rate affairs. The R.A.C. however stuck to their ideas. As said, after this race the rule that mandated mechanics was never again applied.

Track
The Douglas street circuit of the 1933 race was 7.4 km (4.6 mi) long. The 1934 course had been shortened to 5.889 km (3.659 mi) and the 1935 course was altered to a length of 6.494 km (4.035 mi). The start line of the original track was near the Villa Marina on the Douglas Promenade. The first series of corners included Greensills Corner, a sharp right hander that led onto Church Road, followed by an equally sharp left hander that led into Finch Road. Then the course turned right around the House of Keys onto a fast section over Prospect Hill, Bucks Road and Laurieston Road. Next, six sharp bends followed a zigzag pattern over Ballaquale Road, St. Ninians Road, Dukes Road and Falcon Ter before ending up on Victoria Road that led to Governor's Bridge in a fast left hander. A right hand turn onto Governor's Road and Onchan was the most Northern corner of the circuit. From there the course followed a fast steep downwards section on Summer Hill Road between a wall on one side and houses on the other before coming back onto the promenade and ending up via Castle Mona Road at Villa Marina.

The Douglas circuit had a faster average speed than Circuit de Monaco, namely 105 km/h (65 mph), compared to Monaco's 96 km/h (60 mph).

Results

Douglas Circuits 1933-1935

References

External links
 Triple M Register, The R.A.C. Mannin 1934
 The Golden Era - Drivers
 1933 Mannin-Beg Car Race
 1933 Douglas Street Circuit
 1935 Mannin Moar Trophy

Pre-World Championship Grands Prix
Motorsport in the Isle of Man